Johannes Bengs (2 May 1877 in Korsholm – 11 October 1936) was a Finnish farmer and politician. He was a member of the Parliament of Finland from 1922 to 1924, representing the Swedish People's Party of Finland (SFP).

References

1887 births
1936 deaths
People from Korsholm
People from Vaasa Province (Grand Duchy of Finland)
Swedish People's Party of Finland politicians
Members of the Parliament of Finland (1922–24)